Thor Olsen can refer to:

 Thor Olsen (weightlifter) (born 1929), Norwegian Olympic weightlifter
 Thor Egil Olsen (born 1957), Norwegian Olympic rower